Sipsey Creek may refer to:

Sipsey Creek (Buttahatchee River tributary), a stream in Mississippi
Sipsey Creek (Tuscolameta Creek tributary), a stream in Mississippi

See also
Sipsey Fork (disambiguation)
Sipsey River